Vietteia is a monotypic snout moth genus described by Hans Georg Amsel in 1955. Its only species, Vietteia terstrigella, described by Hugo Theodor Christoph, is found in Russia, Kazakhstan, Turkmenistan and Mongolia.

References

External links
lepiforum.eu

Phycitini
Monotypic moth genera
Moths described in 1877
Moths of Europe
Moths of Asia
Pyralidae genera
Taxa named by Hans Georg Amsel